The Nokia 5.1 Plus (also sold as the Nokia X5) is a 2018 mid-range Android smartphone, launched by HMD Global in China. The Nokia 5.1 Plus features a 19:9 aspect ratio, a 5.9-inch HD+ screen, dual cameras, and a notch, among other style features.  The Nokia 5.1 Plus runs Android 8.1 Oreo, and for its processor, it is powered by a MediaTek P60 SoC.  The Nokia 5.1 Plus launched with 3 GB and 4 GB of RAM, with 32 GB or 64 GB of storage which is expandable up to 400GB via microSD.

References 

5.1 Plus
Mobile phones introduced in 2018
Mobile phones with multiple rear cameras